Peter Racine Fricker (5 September 19201 February 1990) was an English composer, among the first to establish his career entirely after the Second World War. He lived in the US for the last thirty years of his life. Fricker wrote over 160 works in all the main genres excepting opera. He was a descendant of the French playwright Racine.

Early career
Fricker was born in Ealing, London, England and studied composition with R. O. Morris, organ with Ernest Bullock and piano with Henry Wilson at the Royal College of Music. After serving in the Royal Air Force during World War II, Fricker undertook a period of study with Mátyás Seiber at Morley College. During the war he served in the Royal Air Force as a radio operator and in 1943 he married (Audrey) Helen Clench, a Czech pianist who had been with him at the RCM. After the war Fricker became a professor of composition at the RCM, and in 1952 he became director of music at Morley College, where he succeeded Michael Tippett.

Music
His Wind Quintet (1947) attracted widespread attention, and his First String Quartet (1947) and First Symphony (1949) were also well received. Four more symphonies (1951, 1960, 1966, 1976) followed, which are among his most appreciated works. Other works include Paseo for guitar (1969), Sinfonia in Memoriam Benjamin Britten (1977), two violin concertos (1950, 1954), choral and chamber works (including the 1956 Sonata for Cello and Piano, recorded twenty years later for L'Oiseau Lyre by Julian Lloyd Webber and John McCabe) and works for piano and organ.

In 1952 his Concertante for three pianos, strings and percussion was performed by the identical twin piano duo Mary and Geraldine Peppin with additional pianist Kyla Greenbaum. His Horn Sonata, Op 24 was premiered by Dennis Brain and the pianist, Harry Isaacs at the Conway Hall, on 20 March 1955.

Stylistically his music was significantly different from the mainstream English school of the middle 20th century; instead of following in the lyrical, folk-song influenced tradition of Holst, Vaughan Williams and others, he wrote music which was chromatic, contrapuntal, and acerbic—more akin to Schoenberg, Bartók, and Hindemith than to any of his English contemporaries. Unlike Schoenberg, however, he never abandoned tonality altogether, preferring to work in a dissonant idiom which retained a tonal basis—a position considered to be conservative in the musical milieu of the 1950s and 1960s.

Later career
Fricker became visiting professor of music at the University of California, Santa Barbara in 1964 and moved with his wife to Goleta, Santa Barbara the following year. Six years later, he took a permanent position at this university; he became chairman of the Music Department in 1970, and was appointed "faculty research lecturer" in 1979, the highest academic honour which the university bestows on its faculty.  However, he maintained links with the UK and Europe through the International Society for Contemporary Music and the Composers' Guild of Great Britain. From 1984 to 1986 he was president of the Cheltenham International Festival of Music and Literature in England. He continued to compose large-scale works, including his Fourth and Fifth symphonies, the oratorio Whispers at these Curtains op 88 (1984) setting John Donne, and the Concerto for Orchestra, composed for the 1986 festival. His final orchestral work, Walk by Quiet Waters (1988), was written for the Santa Barbara Symphony Orchestra, for which he had become composer in residence. But Fricker died the following year, of cancer of the throat, in Santa Barbara, California, United States.

Works
 Oratorio, The Vision of Judgement (1958)
 Symphony No. 1 (1949)
 Symphony No. 2 (1951)
 Symphony No. 3 (1960)
 Symphony No. 4 (1966)
 Symphony No. 5 (1976)
 Concerto for Orchestra (1986)
 Concerto No. 1 for Violin and Small Orchestra (1950)
 Concertante for Cor Anglais and Strings (1950)
 Concertante No. 2 for three pianos, strings and timpani (1951)
 Concerto for Viola and Orchestra (1953)
 Concerto for Piano and Small Orchestra (1954)
 Concerto No. 2 for Violin and Orchestra (Rapsodia Concertante) (1954)
 Concerto No. 2 for Piano and Orchestra (1989)
 String Quartet No. 1 (1948)
 String Quartet No. 2 (1953)
 String Quartet No. 3 (1976)
 Violin Sonata No. 1 (1950)
 Violin Sonata No. 2 (1987)
[Partial List, Complete Catalog can be found online at the University of California, Santa Barbara Library]

Discography
 Symphony No. 2 (with Robert Simpson Symphony No. 1 / Robin Orr Symphony in One Movement). Royal Liverpool Philharmonic Orchestra / Sir John Pritchard, EMI Classics, November 2002 (reissue from 2 LPs, the first coupling the Fricker and Simpson.)
 Violin Sonatas 1 (1950) and 2 (1987) (with Alan Rawsthorne/Vaughan Williams violin sonatas). Susanne Stanzeleit (violin) / Julian Jacobson (piano) Cala Records, September 2000
 A Babe is Born (Choral piece) on "Hodie: An English Christmas Collection". The Sixteen / Harry Christophers Coro Records October 2001
 Cello Sonata (Julian Lloyd Webber and John McCabe, Lyrita, February 2009 – reissue from a 1977 l'Oiseau Lyre LP)
 O Mistress Mine, for voice with guitar accompaniment, Sir Peter Pears, Julian Bream, RCA Victor (1996)
 Violin Concerto, Op.11, F28 (1949–50) (Yfrah Neaman, violin; Norman Del Mar conducting the Royal Philharmonic Orchestra) (2008 Lyrita reissue from a 1974 Argo LP)
 "The Vision of Judgement" (Manning/Tear/Groves/Royal Liverpool Philharmonic Orchestra/Leeds Festival Chorus) and Symphony No. 5 (Weir/Davis/BBC Symphony Orchestra) – Lyrita, 2016.

Here follows a selective list also of the following recordings, which are no longer available—or, at least have not yet been reissued.
 String Quartet No.2, Op.20, F46 (1952–53) (Amadeus Quartet, Argo LP, ca.1963, coupled with Benjamin Britten's 2nd String Quartet.)
 Symphony No.5 with organ, Op.74, F153 (1976) (probably Gillian Weir/Sir Colin Davis/BBC Symphony, which was the 5 May 1976 premiere; on an Aries LP, with the performer listing typically replaced, though the conductor given as "Ernest Weir".) 
 Wind Quintet, Op.5, F11 (1947) (recorded on Argo, 1962, by the Brain Quintet – named for Dennis Brain)

References

External links
Guide to the Peter Racine Fricker papers at the University of California, Santa Barbara Library.
Fricker Chronological Catalogue of Works as prepared by the composer and maintained at University of California, Santa Barbara.
.

1920 births
1990 deaths
20th-century classical composers
English classical composers
English emigrants to the United States
Alumni of the Royal College of Music
Academics of the Royal College of Music
University of California, Santa Barbara faculty
Royal Air Force personnel of World War II
English people of French descent
Musicians from London
20th-century English composers
English male classical composers
20th-century British male musicians
People from Wood Green